The Gap Parish  is a civil parish of Gordon County, New South Wales, a Cadastral divisions of New South Wales.

The Gap Parish is between Molong, New South Wales and Wellington, New South Wales and the (inactive) Molong–Dubbo railway line passes through the parish, The parish is on the Bell River.

See also
 The Gap, New South Wales

References

Parishes of Gordon County (New South Wales)